Tăureni is a commune in Mureș County, Transylvania, Romania that is composed of three villages: Fânațe (Kincstáribirtok), Moara de Jos (Csontostanya) and Tăureni. It has a population of 1,049: 91% Romanians,  7% Roma and 2% Hungarians.

References

Communes in Mureș County
Localities in Transylvania